Fifth Machine Industry Ministry of the PRC, one of the central offices in the People's Republic of China, created on Sept. 2, 1963, who oversaw production of tank equipment and artillery.

In 1982 changed its name to the Ministry of Ordnance Industry.

See also
First Ministry of Machine-Building of the PRC
Second Ministry of Machine-Building of the PRC, ministry of nuclear industry
Third Ministry of Machine-Building of the PRC, ministry of aviation industry
Fourth Ministry of Machine-Building of the PRC, ministry of electronics industry
Sixth Ministry of Machine-Building of the PRC, ministry of shipbuilding
Seventh Ministry of Machine-Building of the PRC, ministry of space industry
Eighth Ministry of Machine-Building of the PRC

Bibliography
 Malcolm Lamb: Directory of officials and Organizations in China, ME Sharpe Inc. Armonk, NY, 2003, p. 1911 +, Volume 1
 China's Economic System, Routledge Abingdon 2005, 594 p., 

Government ministries of the People's Republic of China
Ministries established in 1963
1963 establishments in China